Wenche Barth Eide (born 3 January 1935 in Oslo, Norway) is a Norwegian human rights scholar with base in Law and Social Science Research, daughter of civil engineer Jacob Bøckmann Barth (1898-1974) and Solveig Herstad (1900-1987), married October 10, 1959 to human rights scholar Asbjørn Eide (b. 1933), and the mother of current Norwegian Minister of Climate and the Environment and former Minister of Defence (2011–12) and Minister of Foreign Affairs (2012-13) Espen Barth Eide.

Biography 
Barth Eide holds a Master's Degree (Cand. real.) of Zoology (Zoo-physiology) at the University of Oslo 1962, and a Postgraduate Academic Diploma in Nutrition at the University of London (1965–66). She became a University Fellow, at the Institute for Nutrition Research (1963–66), then moved to the US with her husbond and became a Consultant to the UN System (UN Protein-Calorie Advisory Group, PAG) to lead an African-Norwegian team to prepare a first ever report of the UN on Women in Food Production, Food Handling and Nutrition, on leave from UiO 18 months, 1975-1976. She was a Consultant, of the Norwegian Research Council (at the time Council for Research on Societal Planning, RFSP), and had two-months leave in 1981 to draft a programme for research in economic, social and cultural rights, as developed by an expert committee. Then she became Technical Adviser in Nutrition, at the International Fund for Agricultural Development (IFAD) in Rome (1989–94) on leave from UiO. Barth Eide was Associate  Professor at the University of Oslo, Department of Nutrition (until 1997 under Nordic School of Nutrition), ending in 2005, but had temporary employment January–February 2011. Currently she is in an emeritus position (2013).

Barth Eide was leader of the Centre for International Development Studies (SIU) at the University of Oslo (1981–88), a member of Norad’s Research Committee and of Central Committee for Norwegian Research (Hovedkomiteen for Norsk Forskning), several years from around 1980. In the 1990s she became a member of the Norwegian Institute of International Affairs (NUPI) (1995–98), and a member of the International Food Policy Research Institute (IFPRI), Washington D.C. (1996-2003). She has been in the Member Board of Trustees of the International Foundation for Science (IFS), since 2008.

Honors 
2005: The Internationalisation Prize of the Oslo Student Parliament

Publications (in selection) 
2001: "Breaking Conceptual and Methodological Ground: Promoting the Human Right to Adequate Food and Nutrition. An example of activism with an academic base". Ecology of Food and Nutrition 40(6): 571- 595
2002: "Nutrition and Human Rights", In: Nutrition: A Foundation for Development, UN ACC/Sub-Committee on Nutrition
2003: "Mobilising states and other actors for a rights-based approach to food and nutritional health", In  Moderne aspects of nutrition: present knowledge and future perspectives, Wenche Barth Eide, Arne Oshaug, & Ousmane Sidibe,  Krager, pp. 141 – 142.

References

External links
Wenche Barth Eide, Associate Professor - Department of Nutrition at University of Oslo
Wenche Barth Eide: Retten til mat og frihet fra sult – en topp-politisk utfordring i verdenssamfunnet at Pensjonistuniversitetet Gjøvik (in Norwegian)
Wenche Barth Eide on NSD

1932 births
Living people
Alumni of the University of London
Academic staff of the University of Oslo
20th-century Norwegian scientists
21st-century Norwegian scientists